Burnikha is a rural locality (a village) in Rezhskoye Rural Settlement, Syamzhensky District, Vologda Oblast, Russia. The population was 48 as of 2002.

Geography 
Burnikha is located 47 km northeast of Syamzha (the district's administrative centre) by road. Koltyrikha is the nearest rural locality.

References 

Rural localities in Syamzhensky District